Ángel Perucca (19 August 1918 – 19 September 1981) was an Argentine footballer. He played in 25 matches for the Argentina national football team from 1940 to 1947. He was also part of Argentina's squad for the 1945 South American Championship.

References

External links
 

1918 births
1981 deaths
Argentine footballers
Argentina international footballers
Place of birth missing
Association football midfielders
Newell's Old Boys footballers
San Lorenzo de Almagro footballers
Independiente Santa Fe footballers
Argentine expatriate footballers
Expatriate footballers in Colombia
Argentine football managers
Argentine expatriate football managers
Expatriate football managers in Colombia
Newell's Old Boys managers
América de Cali managers
Club Atlético Tigre managers